Külüllü (also, Gülüllü, Kululu, and Kyulyulyu) is a village in the Agsu Rayon of Azerbaijan.  The village forms part of the municipality of Padar.

References 

Populated places in Agsu District